Caribou Mountains can refer to:

 Caribou Mountains (Alberta) a mountain range in Alberta, Canada
 Caribou Mountains Wildland Park, a park within these mountains
 Caribou Mountains (Idaho) a mountain range in Idaho, United States

See also
 Cariboo Mountains a mountain range of the Columbia Mountains, British Columbia
 Cariboo Mountains Provincial Park, a park within these mountains
 Cariboo Heart Range